The Knot is a 2006 Chinese film directed by Yin Li. It was China's submission to the 80th Academy Awards for the Academy Award for Best Foreign Language Film, but was not nominated.

It won the Best Film in the 2007 Golden Rooster Awards, and was named Outstanding Film by the 2008 Hundred Flowers Awards.

Plot
They fell in love; Chen Qiushui was 20. Wang Biyun was 18. When Qiushui fled Taiwan after the 228 Massacre, Biyun gave him a gold engagement ring and they promised to meet again. Qiushui served as an army doctor during the Korean War, where he met Wang Jindi, a nurse from Shanghai who fell in love with him instantly.  Years had gone by, Qiushui married Jindi and settled in Tibet. While in Taiwan, Biyun buried Qiushui's mother and continued to pray for his return.

Flashback to modern time, Biyun is living in New York. Her niece played by Isabella Leong, a writer, has travelled to Tibet to find out what happened to Qiushui. Through the pictures she sends back via internet, Biyun finally gets to see the familiar face once again.

Cast
Chen Kun as Chen Qiushui / Chen Kunlun
Vivian Hsu as Wang Biyun
Gua Ah-leh as elderly Wang Biyun
Li Bingbing as Wang Jindi
Chin Han as Wang Tingwu
Yang Kuei-mei as Xu Fengniang
Isabella Leong as Wang Xiaorui
Steven Cheung as Xue Zilu
Athena Chu as Mrs. Wang

See also

Cinema of China
List of submissions to the 80th Academy Awards for Best Foreign Language Film

References

External links

The Knot at the Chinese Movie Database

2006 films
Golden Rooster Best Film recipients
Chinese romantic drama films
War romance films
2006 romantic drama films
Films shot in Beijing
Films shot in Fujian
Films shot in Tibet